The History of the Mexicans as Told by Their Paintings is a Spanish language, post-conquest codex written in the 1530s. This manuscript was likely composed by Father Andrés de Olmos, an early Franciscan friar.  It is presumed to be based upon one or more indigenous pictorial codices.

Henry Phillips Jr., a 19th-century historian, made a translation of the document in the 1880s and referred to it as the Codex Ramírez, after Bishop Ramírez de Fuenleal who authorized its creation in 1532.

It is held in the library of the University of Texas at Austin.

See also
Aztec codices

External links
History of the Mexicans as Told by Their Paintings. English translation version by Henry Phillips Jr. (1883). Edited and with annotations by Alec Christensen, FAMSI.
История мексиканцев по их рисункам. Russian translation version by Henry Phillips Jr. (1883). Edited and with annotations by Alec Christensen, FAMSI.
Historia de Mexico with the Tovar calendar, ca. 1830–1862. From the Collections at the Library of Congress

Spanish-language literature about Mesoamerica
1530s books
16th-century manuscripts
History of the Aztecs
History of New Spain
1530s in Mexico